Koppa Gate is a junction on Bannerghatta Road where Begur-Koppa road crosses perpendicular at the boundary of Koppa and Harapanahalli Villages in Jigani in Anekal taluk and this is a busy junction with several small village shops, bus stops, schools etc.

Neighbourhoods in Bangalore
Road junctions in India